Darun Kola-ye Sharqi (also Romanized as Darūn Kolā-ye Sharqī and Darūn Kalā Sharqī, and Darūn Kolā Sharqī) is a village in Babol Kenar Rural District, Babol Kenar District, Babol County, Mazandaran Province, Iran. At the 2006 census, its population was 2,007, in 551 families.

References 

Populated places in Babol County